Chichéis a municipality in the Guatemalan department of El Quiché.

Municipalities of the Quiché Department